Esmailabad (also Romanized as Esmā‘īlābād; also known as Esmā‘īlābād-e Marvdasht and Esma‘il Abad Marvdasht) is a village in Mohammadabad Rural District, in the Central District of Marvdasht County, Fars Province, Iran. At the 2006 census, its population was 570, in 138 families.

References 

Populated places in Marvdasht County